The Liebieghaus is a late 19th-century villa in Frankfurt, Germany. It contains a sculpture museum, the Städtische Galerie Liebieghaus, which is part of the Museumsufer on the Sachsenhausen bank of the River Main.

History

The Liebieghaus was built in 1896, in a palatial, historicist style, as a retirement home for the Bohemian textile manufacturer Baron Heinrich von Liebieg (1839–1904).  The city of Frankfurt acquired the building in 1908 and devoted it to the sculpture collection.

A renovation was completed in October 2009.  This included adding a publicly accessible "Open Depot", making it possible for the first time to view certain parts of the collection that are not in the permanent exhibition.

Collection
The museum includes ancient Greek, Roman and Egyptian sculpture, as well as Medieval, Baroque, Renaissance and Classicist pieces, and works from the Far East. The collection was built up mostly through endowments and international purchases, and is universal in scope, with no particular link to the art or history of Frankfurt.

The building stands on the Schaumainkai, in a garden in which a number of sculptures are also on display, including a replica of Dannecker's Ariadne on the Panther.  The original, which was acquired by the banker Simon Moritz von Bethmann in 1810, is currently in the depot.

Other major exhibits include:
A marble discobolus
A marble statue of Athena, a Roman copy of a Greek original by Myron
Carolingian reliefs carved from ivory (mid-9th century)
An Ottonian crucifix (mid-11th century)
A Romanesque king's head from a statue from the Île-de-France
Fragments from a Florentine tomb by Tino di Camaino (probably after 1318)
An alabaster sculpture of the Trinity by Hans Multscher ( 1430)
A Woman of the Apocalypse by Tilman Riemenschneider
The Rimini Altar, an alabaster calvary from northern France ( 1430)
A late-Gothic/early-Renaissance bust of Bärbel von Ottenheim, the mistress of Jakob von Lichtenberg (the Vogt of Strasbourg), by Nikolaus Gerhaert (1463–64).

Temporary exhibitions 
 2012: Jeff Koons. The Sculptor (at the Liebieghaus)
 2011/12: Nikolaus Gerhaert. The Medieval Sculptor

Gallery

Museumsufer 
Liebieghaus is part of the Museumsufer.

See also 
 Städel
 Museumsufer
 List of museums in Germany
 List of art museums

Notes

Further reading

External links

 
 
 

Museums in Frankfurt
Art museums established in 1909
Art museums and galleries in Germany
Buildings and structures in Frankfurt
Sculpture galleries in Germany
1909 establishments in Germany